Matthew Fredrick Riddle (born January 14, 1986, in Allentown, Pennsylvania) is an American professional wrestler and former mixed martial artist. He is currently signed to WWE, where he performs on the Raw brand.

As a professional MMA fighter from 2008 to 2014, Riddle made a name for himself by appearing on SpikeTV's The Ultimate Fighter 7 and went on to hold a four-fight winning streak in the Ultimate Fighting Championship (UFC) before being fired upon testing positive for smoking marijuana in February 2013. He also fought for Titan FC and compiled a career record of 8–3 (2).

In 2014, Riddle began training at the Monster Factory for a career in professional wrestling and made his actual debut in February 2015. Readers of the Wrestling Observer Newsletter recognized him as the Rookie of the Year and Most Improved wrestler of the year in 2016. Between 2015 and 2018, he worked on the independent circuit, wrestling for promotions such as Pro Wrestling Guerrilla, World Wrestling Network/Evolve, and others. He is a former Evolve Champion, WWN Champion, PWG World Tag Team Champion (with Jeff Cobb), and two-time Progress Atlas Champion.

Riddle signed with WWE in 2018 and portrays a stereotypical carefree, barefoot surfer valley boy. Riddle was originally assigned to the NXT brand, where he was a one-time NXT Tag Team Champion with Pete Dunne as ‘The BroserWeights’, having become champions after winning the 2020 Dusty Rhodes Tag Team Classic tournament. He was later promoted to the main roster, where he won the United States Championship in February 2021. In April, Riddle began teaming with Randy Orton as RK-Bro, winning the Raw Tag Team Championship in August 2021 and March 2022.

Early life and education
Riddle was born January 14, 1986, in Allentown, Pennsylvania. He later moved to Saratoga Springs, New York, where he attended Saratoga Springs High School and was a New York state wrestling champion in 2004. During his high school career, he pinned future UFC champion Jon Jones. 

Riddle later attended East Stroudsburg University, where he was a member of its team for two years and won many championships. After his head coach was fired, Riddle lost his wrestling scholarship and began his transition into MMA.

Mixed martial arts career

Early career

The Ultimate Fighter
Riddle is 1–0 in amateur MMA. During this career, he worked as a roofer and trained in Brazilian jiu-jitsu in the evenings. Riddle credits B.J. Penn's book, Mixed Martial Arts: The Book of Knowledge, in helping him learn during his early years in MMA.

Riddle then fought Dan Simmler, an understudy of Matt Serra, to get into The Ultimate Fighter (TUF) house. Riddle knocked out Simmler in the opening seconds of the second round and struck him three times in the jaw after losing consciousness, breaking Simmler's jaw into two places. Riddle was picked second overall for Team Rampage. During his involvement on show, Riddle was given the nickname Chipper after Rampage noticed him always smiling.

Riddle's second match was against Tim Credeur. Credeur defeated Riddle in the second round, causing him to be knocked out of the tournament. After the fight, Credeur bought Riddle an Xbox 360 with his earnings.

Ultimate Fighting Championship (2008–2013)
At The Ultimate Fighter 7 Finale, which was held on June 21, 2008, Riddle made his UFC and professional debut defeating fellow Ultimate Fighter castmate, Dante Rivera, via unanimous decision (29–28, 30–27, 30–27). During The Ultimate Fighter 7, Riddle was shown multiple times arguing with the older and more experienced Rivera. Dante, on more than one occasion, stated that he would retire if Riddle defeated him.

Riddle was then scheduled to fight Ryan Thomas at UFC 91, but a knee injury forced Riddle out of the fight and got pinned. The knee injury's recovery was scheduled to take about 6–8 weeks.

After his recovery, Riddle fought and defeated Steve Bruno in a unanimous decision (29–28, 29–28, 29–28) at UFC Fight Night: Lauzon vs. Stephens.

In his third bout, Riddle defeated another one of his former Ultimate Fighter 7 castmates, Dan Cramer, via a unanimous decision on the undercard of UFC 101.

He next faced The Ultimate Fighter 9 alumni Nick Osipczak on November 14, 2009, at UFC 105. The fight was held in Osipczak's home country of England. Riddle lost the fight by TKO in the third round.

After his loss to Osipczak, Riddle faced newcomer Greg Soto on March 27, 2010, at UFC 111. After a dominant first two rounds for Riddle, Soto landed an illegal upkick to Riddle's head in the third round which rendered him unable to continue, giving Riddle the victory by disqualification.

Riddle faced DaMarques Johnson on August 1, 2010, at UFC on Versus 2. The fight was a catchweight bout after Johnson weighed in at 172 lbs and Riddle would go on to win the fight via TKO due to punches near the end of the second round.

Riddle was expected to face TJ Waldburger on December 11, 2010, at UFC 124. However, Waldburger was forced from the card with an injury and replaced by newcomer Sean Pierson. Pierson defeated Riddle via unanimous decision (30–27, 30–27, 30–27) and the bout was dubbed by president Dana White as the real Fight of the Night.

Riddle was expected to face Ultimate Fighter castmate, Matt Brown, on March 3, 2011, at UFC Live: Sanchez vs. Kampmann, replacing an injured Mark Scanlon. However, Riddle was also injured, resulting in the Brown fight being removed from the card altogether.

Riddle was expected to face T. J. Grant on June 26, 2011, at UFC on Versus 4. However, Riddle was forced from the bout with an injury and replaced by Charlie Brenneman.

Riddle faced undefeated welterweight prospect Lance Benoist who had made his Octagon debut on September 17, 2011, at UFC Fight Night: Shields vs. Ellenberger. He lost the fight via unanimous decision in a bout that had earned Fight of the Night honors.

Riddle was expected to fight Luis Ramos on December 30, 2011, at UFC 141. However, the fight was called off as Riddle became ill and had to only pull out moments before the fight took place.

Riddle was expected to face Jorge Lopez on February 4, 2012, at UFC 143, replacing an injured Amir Sadollah. However, Lopez was also forced out of the bout and replaced by newcomer Henry Martinez. Riddle won the fight via a split decision.

The bout between Riddle and Ramos was rescheduled for June 22, 2012, at UFC on FX 4. However, Riddle was forced from the bout with another injury, and was replaced by Matt Brown.

Riddle stepped in for Siyar Bahadurzada on short notice to fight Chris Clements at UFC 149. Riddle won the match after catching Clements in a standing arm-triangle choke, forcing him to submit at 2:02 in the third round. Riddle won a $65,000 Submission of the Night bonus. This also marked the first submission win of his professional career. On October 20, 2012, it was announced that Riddle had failed his post-fight drug test, testing positive for marijuana. Riddle was subsequently fined and suspended for 90 days, retroactive to July 21, 2012. His win over Clements was changed to a no contest.

Riddle was originally expected to face Besam Yousef on November 17, 2012, at UFC 154, replacing an injured Stephen Thompson. However, Yousef was forced out with an injury and replaced by John Maguire. Riddle defeated Maguire via a unanimous decision.

Riddle faced Che Mills on February 16, 2013, at UFC on Fuel TV: Barão vs. McDonald. Riddle defeated Mills via split decision. On February 26, 2013, Riddle revealed that he had tested positive for marijuana. This was his second failed drug test within a year, and Riddle was subsequently released from the promotion. He had finished his UFC career ranked 3rd in UFC history for takedown defense (89.3%) and 8th for the total of strikes that have been landed (1350), and without positive marijuana tests would have held an octagon record of 10–3 with a streak of five consecutive victories.

Bellator MMA (2013)

Shortly after being released from the Ultimate Fighting Championship (UFC), Riddle signed a multi-fight deal with Texas-based promotion, Legacy Fighting Championships. However, on May 18, 2013, it was announced that Riddle instead joined the Bellator MMA roster after his Legacy contract had been purchased by the promotion. Riddle was expected to compete in the Bellator's welterweight tournament during their ninth season which begins in the Fall of 2013. However Riddle cracked his rib and had to pull out of the tournament, and subsequently retired from MMA fighting due to financial reasons. A few weeks later Riddle came out of retirement and was expected to fight at Bellator 109. Once again Riddle pulled out of that fight and was subsequently released.

Titan FC (2014)
Riddle fought fellow former UFC fighter Michael Kuiper in the co-main event of Titan FC 27 on February 28, 2014. Riddle won by second round guillotine choke.

Riddle was expected to face MMA legend Jose Landi-Jons for the vacant Welterweight Championship at Titan FC 29 on August 22, 2014. However, Landi-Jons was forced out of the bout due to visa issues, and was replaced by UFC veteran Ben Saunders. However, Riddle was forced out of the bout due to injury and was replaced by the man he was originally scheduled to face, Jose Landi-Jons.

Professional wrestling career

Independent circuit (2014–2018)

On October 29, 2014, it was reported that Riddle was training for a career in professional wrestling. Riddle made his professional wrestling debut on February 7, 2015, at the Monster Factory in Paulsboro, New Jersey. In July 2015, he won the Monster Factory Heavyweight Championship. On September 15, 2015, it was announced that Riddle had signed with the World Wrestling Network (WWN) to work the October Evolve events. Riddle later confirmed that he had taken part in a WWE tryout, which led to them setting up the booking with Evolve. On January 24, 2016, Riddle won Evolve's Style Battle tournament. On April 8, it was reported that Riddle had signed a contract with Evolve's parent company WWN. On September 3, Riddle made his debut for Pro Wrestling Guerrilla (PWG), entering the 2016 Battle of Los Angeles tournament, from which he was eliminated in his first round match by Kyle O'Reilly. In October 2016, Riddle took on Cody Rhodes at New York promotion House of Glory's show titled Unbreakable in a losing effort.

On January 15, 2017, Riddle defeated Rampage Brown to win the Progress Atlas Championship. Riddle debuted for Revolution Pro Wrestling on January 21, unsuccessfully challenging Katsuyori Shibata for the British Heavyweight Championship. On February 11 at CZW 18, Riddle faced David Starr in an inter-promotional champion vs champion match, with Riddle defending Progress Wrestling's Atlas Championship and Starr defending wXw's Shotgun Championship. The match ended in a double disqualification, and neither championship changed hands. On April 1, Riddle defeated five other men to become the inaugural WWN Champion. On August 5 Riddle won The Scenic City Invitational Tournament. On October 20, Riddle and Jeff Cobb, known collectively as "The Chosen Bros", defeated the Lucha Brothers (Rey Fenix and Penta el Zero M) for the PWG World Tag Team Championship. They retained the titles until April 20, 2018, when they lost them against The Rascalz
(Zachary Wentz and Dezmond Xavier).

On April 5, 2018, Riddle defeated Zack Sabre Jr. at Evolve 102 to win the Evolve Championship. 
On August 4, Riddle lost the Evolve Championship to Shane Strickland at Evolve 108.

WWE

Early years in NXT (2018–2020) 
On July 31, 2018, it was reported by Uproxx that Riddle had signed a contract with WWE. On August 18, Riddle appeared at NXT TakeOver: Brooklyn IV and was identified by the event's commentators as WWE's newest signing.

Riddle's NXT debut was on the October 31 edition when he successfully defeated Luke Menzies. On November 17, 2018, on the pre-show of NXT TakeOver: WarGames II, Kassius Ohno interrupted a Riddle interview. When the show started, Riddle challenged Ohno to a match and defeated him in 6 seconds, winning the fastest match in NXT history. Riddle and Ohno had a rematch at NXT TakeOver: Phoenix, where Riddle made Ohno submit with a series of elbow strikes to the head. In 2019, WWE Network released a documentary on his wrestling career and entry into NXT entitled Arrival: Matt Riddle.

Throughout March, Riddle would start a feud with the NXT North American Champion, Velveteen Dream.
On April 5, at NXT TakeOver: New York, Riddle challenged Velveteen Dream for the NXT North American Championship, but was unsuccessful, ending his undefeated streak in NXT. In July, Riddle started a feud with the returning Killian Dain. On the August 7 episode of NXT, Riddle was supposed to face Dain, but it never happened as they brawled before the match happened. The two brawled at NXT TakeOver: Toronto and eventually faced each other on the August 21 episode of NXT, where Dain was victorious, but Riddle attacked Dain after the match. On the premiere episode of NXT on the USA Network on Sep 18, Riddle fought Dain in a Street Fight but ended in a no contest. A week later on the Sep 25 episode of NXT, Riddle again fought Dain in a Street Fight but this the winner would be the #1 Contender for the NXT Championship which Riddle won by submission. On the Oct 2 episode of NXT, Riddle unsuccessfully challenged NXT Champion Adam Cole.

On the November 1 episode of SmackDown, Riddle and Keith Lee were one of the many NXT wrestlers to invade the show, confronting and ultimately attacking Sami Zayn. Later that night, Riddle joined Triple H and the rest of the NXT roster as they declared war on both Raw and SmackDown, and vowed to win the Survivor Series brand warfare. In November, Riddle would start feuding with Finn Bálor. On the November 13 episode of NXT, Finn Bálor insulted the NXT roster as "all boys who can't take a beating", specifically mentioning Johnny Gargano and Matt Riddle. Riddle attacked Bálor, who retreated. Riddle was originally part of Team Ciampa for NXT Takeover: Wargames, but on the Nov 13 episode of NXT, Riddle got taken off Team Ciampa due to Riddle having a match with Bálor at Wargames; at the event Riddle lost to Bálor. The following night at Survivor Series, Riddle was part of Team NXT in a losing effort to Team SmackDown also involving Team Raw during the match Riddle eliminated Randy Orton with a roll-up pin before being laid out with an RKO that caused him to be eliminated by King Corbin. Riddle participated in the Royal Rumble match at the namesake pay-per-view and entered at #23 but was eliminated by Corbin in 41 seconds.

Championship reigns (2020–2021) 
On the January 10, 2020, episode of NXT, the participants of the 2020 Dusty Rhodes Tag Team Classic were announced, with Riddle and Pete Dunne being announced as surprise participants; they would later take on the name of The BroserWeights, a portmanteau of Riddle's "Original Bro" nickname and Dunne's "Bruiserweight" nickname. Together, they defeated Mark Andrews and Flash Morgan Webster in the first round on January 15, Fabian Aichner and Marcel Barthel of Imperium in the semifinals on January 22, and Grizzled Young Veterans (James Drake and Zack Gibson) in the finals on January 29 to win the tournament and earn a match against Bobby Fish and Kyle O'Reilly of The Undisputed Era for the NXT Tag Team Championship at NXT TakeOver: Portland. At the event on February 16, Riddle and Dunne defeated Fish and O'Reilly to win the titles, marking Riddle's first title win in WWE. When Dunne couldn't travel to the United States because of the COVID-19 pandemic, he picked Timothy Thatcher as his replacement for Riddle's partner. Riddle and Thatcher would lose the titles against Imperium (Fabian Aichner and Marcel Barthel) on the May 13 episode of NXT after Thatcher walked out on him. On the May 27 episode of NXT Riddle and Thatcher fought in a Fight Pit match, with WWE Hall of Famer, Kurt Angle as the special guest referee, where Riddle lost to Thatcher by technical submission. This would turn out to be Riddle's last match in NXT.

On May 29, 2020, Kurt Angle announced that Riddle would move to the SmackDown brand. On the June 19 episode of SmackDown, Riddle made his main roster debut, where he interrupted Intercontinental Champion AJ Styles before defeating Styles in a non-title match. Riddle received an opportunity at the title on the July 17 episode of SmackDown, where he lost to Styles. After the match, he was attacked by King Corbin. This led to a match at Payback, where Riddle defeated Corbin. He lost to Corbin on the September 25 episode of SmackDown, ending their feud. 

As part of the 2020 Draft in October, Riddle was drafted to the Raw brand. On October 29, his ring name was shortened to Riddle for unknown reasons. Riddle would participate on Team Raw in the men's traditional elimination tag team match at the Survivor Series, where he would pin Corbin on route to a clean sweep for Raw. In December, Riddle would begin a feud with United States Champion Bobby Lashley. On the January 4, 2021, episode of Raw, Riddle defeated Lashley in a non-title match and would earn a title match the following week but failed to capture the championship. On the January 25 episode, Riddle defeated The Hurt Business (Cedric Alexander, MVP, and Shelton Benjamin) in a gauntlet match to earn another title opportunity against Lashley. At the Royal Rumble, Riddle entered at number 16 and helped eliminate Lashley before being eliminated by Seth Rollins. Riddle received his title match the following night on Raw, where he defeated Lashley by disqualification but did not win the championship. On February 21 at Elimination Chamber, Riddle defeated Lashley and John Morrison in a triple threat match to win the United States Championship, his first title on the main roster and his first singles title in WWE. He lost the title to Sheamus on Night 2 of WrestleMania 37, ending his reign at 49 days.

RK-Bro (2021–2022) 

On the April 19 episode of Raw, Riddle would interrupt a backstage interview by Randy Orton where Riddle suggested a tag team formation, with Orton dismissing the idea by leaving. A match was made later on in the night between Orton and Riddle, which Riddle won with a roll-up. The following week on Raw, Orton was backstage with Riddle when he suggested the team be given a try; the newly labeled RK-Bro defeated Cedric Alexander and Shelton Benjamin, and in a backstage interview afterwards, Orton suggested to Riddle they take the team "a day at a time", thus turning Orton face for the first time since early 2020.

After a seven week absence, Orton returned on the August 9 episode of Raw, where he initially discontinued his team with Riddle at the beginning of the show. Later on in the night, Orton defeated AJ Styles in a match following assistance from Riddle and afterwards pretended to hug him but instead hit him with an RKO as a sign of gratitude. The following week, Orton officially reunited the team after Riddle saved Orton from an attack at the hands of Omos and Styles. At SummerSlam, RK-Bro defeated Styles and Omos to win their first WWE Raw Tag Team Championship, both individually and as a team.  At Crown Jewel, RK-Bro would retain their titles against AJ Styles and Omos. While performing on Raw, Riddle returned to NXT on the December 7 episode, revealing himself as the Shaman for MSK. At New Year's Evil, they defeated Imperium (Walter, Fabian Aichner, and Marcel Barthel) in a six-man tag team match. At Day 1, RK-Bro retained their titles against The Street Profits (Angelo Dawkins and Montez Ford).

On the January 10, 2022, episode of Raw, RK-Bro lost the titles to Alpha Academy (Chad Gable and Otis), ending their reign at 142 days. Riddle participated in the Royal Rumble match at the namesake event before being eliminated by eventual winner Brock Lesnar. Riddle later competed in the WWE Championship Elimination Chamber match at the namesake event, where he was again eliminated by Brock Lesnar, who won the match. On the March 7 episode of Raw, RK-Bro won their second Raw Tag Team Championship after defeating Alpha Academy and Kevin Owens & Seth "Freakin" Rollins in a triple threat tag team match. They went on to successfully defend the titles at WrestleMania 38 in another triple threat tag team match against Alpha Academy and The Street Profits. The SmackDown Tag Team Champions, The Usos, would challenge RK-Bro to a tag team championship unification match at WrestleMania Backlash with Orton reluctantly accepting. The match at the event, however, was changed into a non-title six-man tag team match, in which The Bloodline (Roman Reigns and The Usos) defeated RK-Bro and Drew McIntyre after Reigns pinned Riddle. The unification match between RK-Bro and The Usos was later scheduled for the May 20 episode of SmackDown, where RK-Bro lost their titles to The Usos, ending their second reign at 74 days.

Various feuds (2022–present) 
After Orton was sidelined with a back injury, Riddle continued to feud with The Bloodline, teaming with Shinsuke Nakamura to unsuccessfully challenge The Usos for the Undisputed WWE Tag Team Championship on the June 3 episode of SmackDown following a distraction from Bloodline associate Sami Zayn. With a win over Zayn the following week, Riddle earned a match against Reigns for the Undisputed WWE Universal Championship. On the June 17 episode of SmackDown, Riddle lost to Reigns, barring him from challenging Reigns for the title again. On the June 20 episode of Raw, Riddle failed to qualify for the Money in the Bank ladder match after losing to Omos. However, he won a last chance qualifying battle royal the following week to earn his way into the match. At the eponymous event on July 2, he was unsuccessful in winning the match. 

He then began feuding with Seth "Freakin" Rollins, leading to a match between the two being announced for SummerSlam. However, the match was postponed by WWE after Riddle suffered an injury following an attack by Rollins on the July 25 episode of Raw. Despite the injury, Riddle appeared at SummerSlam and called out Rollins, leading to a brawl which saw Rollins come out on top. On the August 29 episode of Raw, his ring name was reverted back to Matt Riddle. Riddle and Rollins finally faced off at Clash at the Castle on September 3, where Riddle was defeated. On the September 19 episode of Raw, Riddle got involved in a United States Championship match between the champion Bobby Lashley and Rollins, causing Rollins to lose the match. Later in the show, during another brawl, Riddle challenged Rollins to a Fight Pit match at Extreme Rules. The match was confirmed by WWE, making it the first Fight Pit match on the main roster. Further, it was also announced that UFC Hall of Famer Daniel Cormier will serve as the special guest referee for the match. At the event on October 8, Riddle defeated Rollins via submission. On the October 17 episode of Raw, Riddle failed to win the United States Championship from Rollins ending their feud. 

On December 13, it was reported that Riddle had been suspended for 60 days after failing WWE's wellness policy for a second time. It was also stated that he had previously failed the wellness policy for the first time earlier that summer, with it having been unreported until his second failure (with this being why his match with Seth Rollins at SummerSlam was postponed). WWE reportedly sent him to rehab, supposedly stating that if he refused he would be fired.

Personal life

Riddle married Lisa Rennie in 2011. They have fraternal twin daughters and a son. The couple divorced in March 2022.

Riddle is an experienced practitioner of Brazilian jiu-jitsu and was promoted to black belt in the sport by Daniel Gracie, Rolles Gracie, and David Floridia on January 28, 2022.

Sexual assault allegation
In the summer of 2020, Riddle was accused of sexually assaulting female independent wrestler Candy Cartwright. Cartwright alleges that after an independent show in May 2018, Riddle asked Cartwright to have sex with him, and when Cartwright turned down Riddle's request, she claims that Riddle choked her and forced her to give him oral sex. WWE released a statement claiming they were looking into the incident; Riddle immediately denied the allegations in a video posted to his Twitter page. Riddle stated that he had an affair with Cartwright, but sexual relations between the two were completely consensual.

Riddle later filed for a restraining order against Cartwright, alleging that she harassed, stalked, and threatened his safety both in person and over the internet. In September 2020, Riddle withdrew his petition for a restraining order. On October 8, 2020, Cartwright filed a lawsuit against Riddle, WWE, and Evolve president Gabe Sapolsky over the incident. In March 2021, the court dismissed WWE and Sapolsky as defendants in the suit, stating that their connection to the allegations could not be proven. Cartwright dropped the lawsuit on July 13, 2021.

Other media
Riddle made his video game debut as a playable character in WWE 2K20 and subsequently in WWE 2K22 and WWE 2K23.

Championships and accomplishments

Mixed martial arts
Ultimate Fighting Championship
Fight of the Night (1 time) vs. Lance Benoist
Submission of the Night (1 time) vs. Chris Clements

Professional wrestling
5 Star Wrestling
5 Star Tap or Snap Championship (1 time)
Beyond Wrestling
Tournament for Today Men (2016)
Evolve
Evolve Championship (1 time)
Style Battle (2016)
Hope Wrestling
Hope 24/7 Hardcore Championship (1 time)
IWA Mid-South
 Revolution Strong Style Tournament (2018)
Keystone Pro Wrestling
KPW Tag Team Championship (1 time) – with Punisher Martinez
Monster Factory Pro Wrestling
Monster Factory Heavyweight Championship (1 time)
Pro Wrestling Illustrated
 Ranked No. 46 of the top 500 singles wrestlers in the PWI 500 in 2018
Progress Wrestling
Progress Atlas Championship (2 times)
Pro Wrestling Chaos
King of Chaos Championship (1 time)
Pro Wrestling Guerrilla
PWG World Tag Team Championship (1 time) – with Jeff Cobb
Scenic City Invitational
Scenic City Invitational Tournament (2017)
Sports Illustrated
Ranked No. 5 of the top 10 men's wrestlers in 2018
Ranked No. 8 of the top 10 wrestlers in 2017
Style Battle
Style Battle (8, 9)
Westside Xtreme Wrestling
 AMBITION 8 (2017)
WWNLive
 WWN Championship (1 time)
Wrestling Observer Newsletter
Most Improved (2016)
Rookie of the Year (2016)
WWE
WWE United States Championship (1 time)
WWE Raw Tag Team Championship (2 times) – with Randy Orton
NXT Tag Team Championship (1 time) – with Pete Dunne
Dusty Rhodes Tag Team Classic (2020) – with Pete Dunne

Mixed martial arts record

|-
|Win
|align=center| 8–3 (2)
| Michael Kuiper
| Submission (guillotine choke)
|Titan FC 27
| 
|align=center| 2
|align=center| 2:29
|Kansas City, Kansas, United States
|
|-
|NC
|align=center| 7–3 (2)
| Che Mills
| NC (overturned)
| UFC on Fuel TV: Barão vs. McDonald
| 
|align=center| 3
|align=center| 5:00
|London, England
|
|-
|Win
|align=center| 7–3 (1)
| John Maguire
| Decision (unanimous)
| UFC 154
| 
|align=center| 3
|align=center| 5:00
|Montreal, Quebec, Canada
|
|-
|NC
|align=center| 6–3 (1)
| Chris Clements
| NC (overturned) 
| UFC 149
| 
|align=center| 3
|align=center| 2:02
|Calgary, Alberta, Canada
|
|-
|Win
|align=center| 6–3
| Henry Martinez
| Decision (split)
| UFC 143
| 
|align=center| 3
|align=center| 5:00
|Las Vegas, Nevada, United States
| 
|-
| Loss
|align=center| 5–3
| Lance Benoist
| Decision (unanimous)
| UFC Fight Night: Shields vs. Ellenberger
| 
|align=center| 3
|align=center| 5:00
|New Orleans, Louisiana, United States
|
|-
| Loss
|align=center| 5–2
| Sean Pierson
| Decision (unanimous)
| UFC 124
| 
|align=center| 3
|align=center| 5:00
|Montreal, Quebec, Canada
| 
|-
| Win
|align=center| 5–1
| DaMarques Johnson
| TKO (punches)
| UFC Live: Jones vs. Matyushenko
| 
|align=center| 2
|align=center| 4:29
|San Diego, California, United States
| 
|-
| Win
|align=center| 4–1
| Greg Soto
| DQ (illegal upkick)
| UFC 111
| 
|align=center| 3
|align=center| 1:30
|Newark, New Jersey, United States
| 
|-
| Loss
|align=center| 3–1
| Nick Osipczak
| TKO (elbows and punches)
| UFC 105
| 
|align=center| 3
|align=center| 3:53
|Manchester, England
| 
|-
| Win
|align=center| 3–0
| Dan Cramer
| Decision (unanimous)
| UFC 101
| 
|align=center| 3
|align=center| 5:00
|Philadelphia, Pennsylvania, United States
| 
|-
| Win
|align=center| 2–0
| Steve Bruno
| Decision (unanimous)
| UFC Fight Night: Lauzon vs. Stephens
| 
|align=center| 3
|align=center| 5:00
|Tampa, Florida, United States
| 
|-
| Win
|align=center| 1–0
| Dante Rivera
| Decision (unanimous)
| The Ultimate Fighter 7 Finale
| 
|align=center| 3
|align=center| 5:00
|Las Vegas, Nevada, United States
| 

|-
|Loss
|align=center|1–1
| Tim Credeur
| Submission (armbar) 
|rowspan=2|The Ultimate Fighter: Team Rampage vs. Team Forrest
| (air date)
|align=center|2
|align=center|4:06
|rowspan=2|Las Vegas, Nevada, United States
|
|-
|Win
|align=center|1–0
| Dan Simmler
| KO (punch) 
| (air date)
|align=center|2
|align=center|0:09
|

References

External links 

UFC Profile

"Former EVOLVE employee files speaking out lawsuit against Matt Riddle, WWE issues statement", eWrestling, October 9, 2020

1986 births
Living people
21st-century professional wrestlers
American male mixed martial artists
American male professional wrestlers
American Muay Thai practitioners
American practitioners of Brazilian jiu-jitsu
American sportspeople in doping cases
Doping cases in mixed martial arts
Mixed martial artists from Pennsylvania
Mixed martial artists utilizing Brazilian jiu-jitsu
Mixed martial artists utilizing collegiate wrestling
Mixed martial artists utilizing Greco-Roman wrestling
Mixed martial artists utilizing Muay Thai
NXT Tag Team Champions
NWA/WCW/WWE United States Heavyweight Champions
People awarded a black belt in Brazilian jiu-jitsu
People from Del Rio, Texas
Progress Wrestling Atlas Champions
PWG World Tag Team Champions
Sportspeople from Allentown, Pennsylvania
Ultimate Fighting Championship male fighters
Welterweight mixed martial artists